Interleukin 16 is a pro-inflammatory pleiotropic cytokine. It's precursor, pro-interleukin-16 is a protein that in humans is encoded by the IL16 gene. This gene was discovered in 1982 at Boston University by Dr. David Center and Dr. William Cruikshank.

Function 

The cytokine encoded by this gene is a pleiotropic cytokine that functions as a chemoattractant, a modulator of T cell activation, and an inhibitor of HIV replication. The signaling process of this cytokine is mediated by CD4. The product of this gene undergoes proteolytic processing, which is found to yield two functional proteins. The cytokine function is exclusively attributed to the secreted C-terminal peptide, while the N-terminal product may play a role in cell cycle control. Caspase 3 is reported to be involved in the proteolytic processing of this protein. Two alternatively spliced transcript variants encoding distinct isoforms have been reported. Interleukin 16 (IL-16) is released by a variety of cells (including lymphocytes and some epithelial cells) that has been characterized as a chemoattractant for certain immune cells expressing the cell surface molecule CD4. IL-16 was originally described as a factor that could attract activated T cells in humans, it was previously called lymphocyte chemoattractant factor (LCF).  Since then, this interleukin has been shown to recruit and activate many other cells expressing the CD4 molecule, including monocytes, eosinophils, and dendritic cells.

The structure of IL-16 was determined following its cloning in 1994. This cytokine is produced as a precursor peptide (pro-IL-16) that requires processing by an enzyme called caspase-3 to become active. CD4 is the cell signaling receptor for mature IL-16.

Interactions 

Interleukin 16 has been shown to interact with:
 GRIN2A, 
 GRIN2D, 
 KCNJ10, 
 KCNJ15,
 Kir2.1, 
 PPP1R12A, and
 PPP1R12B.

References

Further reading

External links 
 

Interleukins